Tomasz Balul (born 12 August 1983) is a Polish footballer who currently plays for Sarmacja Będzin.

External links
 
 

1983 births
Living people
Polish footballers
Association football defenders
Sportspeople from Chorzów
Expatriate footballers in Belarus
Polish expatriate footballers
Ruch Chorzów players
FC Partizan Minsk players
Piast Gliwice players
Zagłębie Sosnowiec players
GKS Tychy players
Karpaty Krosno players
Szombierki Bytom players